A caravan (from Persian  ) or cafila (from Arabic  ) is a group of people traveling together, often on a trade expedition. Caravans were used mainly in desert areas and throughout the Silk Road, where traveling in groups aided in defense against bandits as well as helped to improve economies of scale in trade. Some of the first caravans on the Silk Road were sent out by Emperor Wu of Han in the 2nd century BCE when this vast network of roads was 'born', and as China began exporting large quantities of silk and other goods west, particularly destined for the Roman Empire.

Description
In historical times, caravans connecting East Asia and Europe often carried luxurious and lucrative goods, such as silks or jewelry. Caravans could therefore require considerable investment and were a lucrative target for bandits. The profits from a successfully undertaken journey could be enormous, comparable to the later European spice trade. The luxurious goods brought by caravans attracted many rulers along important trade routes to construct caravanserais. These were roadside stations which supported the flow of commerce, information, and people across the network of trade routes covering Asia, North Africa, and southeastern Europe, especially along the Silk Road. Caravanserais provided water for human and animal consumption, washing, and ritual ablutions. Sometimes they had elaborate baths. They kept fodder for animals and had shops for travelers where they could acquire new supplies. Some shops bought goods from the traveling merchants.

However, the volume a caravan could transport was limited even by Classical or Medieval standards. For example, a caravan of 500 camels could only transport as much as a third or half of the goods carried by a regular Byzantine merchant sailing ship.

Present-day caravans in less-developed areas of the world often still transport important goods through badly passable areas, such as seeds required for agriculture in arid regions. An example are the camel trains traversing the southern edges of the Sahara Desert.

See also
Convoy
Camel train
Wagon train
Central American migrant caravans of 2017–22

References

Further reading
Kevin Shillington (ed), "Tuareg: Takedda and trans-Saharan trade" in: Encyclopaedia of African History, Fitzroy Dearborn, 2004, 
T. Lewicki, "The Role of the Sahara and Saharians in Relationships between North and South", in: UNESCO General History of Africa: Volume 3, University of California Press, 1994, 
Fernand Braudel, The Perspective of the World, vol III of Civilization and Capitalism 1984 (translated from the French)

Antiquity and Middle Ages
The Trans-Saharan Gold Trade 7th-14th Century; Metropolitan Museum of Art
René Mouterde, André Poidebard, « La voie antique des caravanes entre Palmyre et Hît, au IIe siècle après Jésus-Christ, d'après une inscription retrouvée au Sud-Est de Palmyre (1930) », Syria, vol. 12, No. 12-22, 1931, pp. 101–115 (available online at: Persee.fr) 
Ernest Will, « Marchands et chefs de caravanes à Palmyre », Syria, vol.34, No. 34-3-4, 1957, pp. 262–277 (available online at: Persee.fr) 

17th century
René Caillié Journal d'un voyage à Temboctou et à Jenné, dans l'Afrique centrale, précédé d'observations faites chez les Maures Braknas, les Nalous et autres peuples ; pendant les années 1824, 1825, 1826, 1827, 1828: par René Caillié. Avec une carte itinéraire, et des remarques géographiques, par M. Jomard, membre de l'institut. Imprimé à Paris en mars 1830, par l'imprimerie royale, en trois tomes et un atlas. Une réédition en fac-similé a été réalisée par les éditions Anthropos en 1965. downloadable version
 modern edition: Voyage à Tombouctou. 2 vols. Paris: La Découverte, 1996 

20th century
Lattimore, Owen (1928/9) The Desert Road to Turkestan. London, Methuen and Co; & various later editions. Caravan logistics and organization is discussed in Chap. VIII, "Camel-Men All"
 Tuladhar, Kamal Ratna (2011). Caravan to Lhasa: A Merchant of Kathmandu in Traditional Tibet. Kathmandu: Lijala & Tisa. .

Contemporary caravans
Julien Brachet, « Le négoce caravanier au Sahara central: histoire, évolution des pratiques et enjeux chez les Touaregs Kel Aïr (Niger) », Les Cahiers d'outre-mer, No. 226-227, 2004, pp. 117–136 (available online at: Com.revues )
Michel Museur, « Un exemple spécifique d'économie caravanière : l'échange sel-mil », Journal des africanistes, vol.47, No. 2, 1977, pp. 49–80 (available online at: Persee.fr) 
M'hammad Sabour and Knut S. Vikør (eds), Ethnic Encounter and Culture Change, Bergen, 1997,  Google Cache Last Retrieved Jan. 2005.

External links
 
 

Trade routes